Asadabad (also Romanized as Asadābād) is a village in Baqerabad Rural District, in the Central District of Mahallat County, Markazi Province, Iran. At the 2006 census, its population was 23, in 5 families.

References 

Populated places in Mahallat County